The Palace of Sans-Souci, or Sans-Souci Palace, was the principal royal residence of Henry I, King of Haiti, better known as Henri Christophe. Being among the first buildings constructed in a free Haiti after the Haitian Revolution, the Palace and the neighboring Citadelle, are Haitian icons and global symbols of liberty, and were inscribed on the World Heritage List in 1982.

History
The palace's name, French for "carefree", is shared with both Sanssouci, Frederick the Great's palace in Potsdam, Germany, and with Haitian Revolution military leader Jean-Baptiste Sans Souci, who was executed by Henri Christophe in 1803. The palace was built between 1810 and 1813 by an undetermined number of workers.

The residence accommodated the king, his family, Queen Marie-Louise and their children, along with their royal staff of advisors. It was the most important of nine palaces commissioned by the king, as well as fifteen châteaux, numerous forts, and sprawling summer homes on his twenty plantations. The nearest airport and large city is Cap-Haïtien.

Before the construction of Sans-Souci, Milot was a French plantation that Christophe managed for a period during the Haitian Revolution. Many of Henri Christophe's contemporaries noted his ruthlessness, and it is unknown how many laborers died during the palace's construction. Under his reign, the palace was the site of opulent feasts and dances. It had immense gardens, artificial springs, and a system of waterworks. The site was formerly the area where Henri worked the fields for the French.

Though Sans-Souci is now an empty ruin, at the time its splendor was noted by many foreign visitors. One American physician remarked that it had "the reputation of having been one of the most magnificent edifices of the West Indies."

Close to the palace is the renowned mountaintop fortress; the Citadelle Laferrière, built under a decree by Henri Christophe to repel a feared French invasion that never occurred. It is reached by continuing on the trail behind the palace.

Crippled by stroke on 15 August 1820, Henri committed suicide by shooting himself with a silver bullet on the grounds of the palace on 8 October 1820. He was subsequently buried in the Citadelle. His son and heir, Jacques-Victor Henry was bayoneted to death by revolutionaries ten days later.

A severe earthquake in 1842 destroyed a considerable part of the palace and devastated the nearby city of Cap-Haïtien; the palace was never rebuilt.

The palace shares its name with another Haitian revolutionary leader, Jean-Baptiste Sans Souci. He was an African slave who may have taken his name from the quartier near the parish of Grande Rivière where he first led troops in guerrilla fighting against the French in 1791. When Henri Christophe and other military leaders split from the French, they asked Sans Souci to join their ranks, but he declined and particularly viewed Christophe as a traitor. About ten years before the construction of his palace, the future Haitian king sent Colonel Sans Souci a conciliatory message inviting him to one of his headquarters at the main Grand Pré plantation, adjacent to the Milot plantation where he would later build the palace. When Sans Souci arrived, Christophe's guards bayoneted him and his small band of guards to death. Sans Souci Palace was built only a few yards away, or perhaps even exactly over, the place where Sans Souci the man was killed by Christophe.

Inspiration
Some scholars have also asked whether Christophe took part of his inspiration for the palace from the Prussian king Frederick the Great's palace in Potsdam, Sanssouci, a symbol of European Enlightenment achievement. Other scholars argue, the palace's architecture is inspired by the Boffrand's designs for the Château de la Malgrange for Leopold, Duke of Lorraine, near Nancy.

In any event, the palace' splendor was remarked upon by various visitors, generally acknowledged by many to be the Caribbean equivalent to the Palace of Versailles in France. Proud of its magnificence, the Palace of Sans-Souci was an important step in Henri Christophe's plan to demonstrate to foreigners, particularly Europeans and Americans, the power and capability of the black race. The African pride in the construction of the king's palace was captured by the comment of his advisor and architect, Pompée Valentin Vastey (Baron Valentin de Vastey), who said that the palace and its nearby church, "erected by descendants of Africans, show that we have not lost the architectural taste and genius of our ancestors who covered Ethiopia, Egypt, Carthage, and old Spain with their superb monuments."

Current status

UNESCO designated it—and the Citadelle—World Heritage Sites in 1982.

Described as "one of the most remarkable attractions in the Western Hemisphere", the Palace of Sans-Souci is "seldom visited by foreigners" due to "decades of political instability and lawlessness" in Haiti.

References

External links 

 UNESCO World Heritage listing for the National History Park – Citadel, Sans Souci, Ramiers 
Explore Sans-Souci Palace with Google Earth on Global Heritage Network

Bibliography
• Gauvin Alexander Bailey Der Palast von Sans-Souci in Milot, Haiti (ca. 1806–1813): Das vergessene Potsdam im Regenwald / The Palace of Sans-Souci in Milot, Haiti (ca. 1806–1813): The Untold Story of the Potsdam of the Rainforest, Deutscher Kunstverlag, 2018, 

History of Haiti
World Heritage Sites in Haiti
Ruins in Haiti
Nord (Haitian department)
Houses completed in 1813
Palaces in Haiti